Joshua Gibson (born 13 March 1984) is a former Australian rules football player who played for the North Melbourne Football Club and Hawthorn Football Club in the Australian Football League and is regarded as one of the greatest defenders of his generation. He is a member of Hawthorn's 2013, 2014 and 2015 premiership winning teams, winning the Peter Crimmins Medal in both 2013 and 2015 premiership seasons. Gibson was known for his spoiling prowess down back and holds the record for most one percenters in AFL history.

Playing career

Early career
Gibson began playing football with Surrey Park and played junior football for East Burwood, before moving on to play for the Oakleigh Chargers in the TAC Cup and Victorian Football League side Port Melbourne. Gibson was recruited from Port Melbourne Football Club in the Victorian Football League (VFL) and drafted onto the Kangaroos (North Melbourne) rookie list in 2006.

North Melbourne (Kangaroos)

Gibson played 10 matches with the Kangaroos in 2006. On 3 June 2007, he suffered a head injury in the bathroom at his home as he was preparing for training. After initially being ruled out of football for the remainder of the season, he returned to the AFL in round 21 and was able to shut out Lance Franklin who had kicked seven goals the previous round.

Hawthorn 
Immediately after the 2009 season, Gibson requested to be traded to the Hawthorn Football Club. The deal was done early on the first day of the 2009 trade week, with Gibson traded, along with North Melbourne's fifth round draft pick No. 69 (Hawks picked Taylor Duryea) for Hawthorn's second and third round draft picks (No. 25 and No. 41 overall). Gibson had a season interrupted by injury in 2010; he tore his hamstring in the third round but recovered to play 12 games. He played in every game in 2011, holding the backline together after longterm injuries to key backmen Ben Stratton and Stephen Gilham. In 2013, Gibson won the Hawthorn best and fairest award, the Peter Crimmins Medal. He won his second Peter Crimmins medal in 2015. Coming off his third consecutive premiership with Hawthorn, Gibson starred in the club's first home game of 2016, ending the match with an equal-club record 44 disposals in a victory over the West Coast Eagles. On August 15, 2017 he announced his retirement from the AFL at the conclusion of the 2017 season.

Coaching career

North Melbourne
On 15 December 2022, it was announced that Gibson returned to the North Melbourne Football Club as a part-time assistant coach in the role of defence specialist coach supporting fellow assistant coach John Blakey who is overseeing the defence under senior coach Alastair Clarkson.

Personal life
Josh Gibson was born in, and grew up in Blackburn, Victoria. He was instantly recognisable because of his afro hairstyle before he cut it. Gibson has direct links to Barbados, where his father was born. He attended Trinity Grammar School in Kew. Gibson is currently living in Sydney and is the owner of BeFit training Double Bay. He has appeared in multiple ad campaigns for Bondi Protein.

Statistics

|- 
| 2006 ||  || 38
| 11 || 0 || 2 || 73 || 68 || 141 || 32 || 24 || 0.0 || 0.2 || 6.6 || 6.2 || 12.8 || 2.9 || 2.2 || 0
|-
| 2007 ||  || 38
| 12 || 0 || 0 || 69 || 86 || 155 || 37 || 18 || 0.0 || 0.0 || 5.8 || 7.2 || 12.9 || 3.1 || 1.5 || 0
|-  
| 2008 ||  || 38
| 20 || 1 || 1 || 133 || 145 || 278 || 75 || 32 || 0.1 || 0.1 || 6.7 || 7.3 || 13.9 || 3.8 || 1.6 || 0
|- 
| 2009 ||  || 38
| 22 || 1 || 2 || 210 || 173 || 383 || 102 || 71 || 0.0 || 0.1 || 9.5 || 7.9 || 17.4 || 4.6 || 3.2 || 4
|-  
| 2010 ||  || 6
| 12 || 0 || 0 || 75 || 106 || 181 || 39 || 24 || 0.0 || 0.0 || 6.3 || 8.8 || 15.1 || 3.3 || 2.0 || 0
|- 
| 2011 ||  || 6
| 25 || 0 || 0 || 248 || 185 || 433 || 134 || 56 || 0.0 || 0.0 || 9.9 || 7.4 || 17.3 || 5.4 || 2.2 || 4
|- 
| 2012 ||  || 6
| 22 || 0 || 0 || 195 || 158 || 353 || 108 || 47 || 0.0 || 0.0 || 8.9 || 7.2 || 16.0 || 4.9 || 2.1 || 3
|- 
| bgcolor=F0E68C | 2013# ||  || 6
| 24 || 0 || 0 || 204 || 232 || 436 || 113 || 46 || 0.0 || 0.0 || 8.5 || 9.7 || 18.2 || 4.7 || 1.9 || 2
|-  
| bgcolor=F0E68C | 2014# ||  || 6
| 17 || 0 || 0 || 190 || 169 || 359 || 102 || 34 || 0.0 || 0.0 || 11.2 || 9.9 || 21.1 || 6.0 || 2.0 || 3
|-
| bgcolor=F0E68C | 2015# ||  || 6
| 25 || 0 || 3 || 303 || 244 || 547 || bgcolor="CAE1FF" | 207† || 38 || 0.0 || 0.1 || 12.1 || 9.8 || 21.9 || 8.3 || 1.0 || 1
|-  
| 2016 ||  || 6
| 23 || 3 || 0 || 227 || 236 || 463 || 150 || 65 || 0.1 || 0.0 || 9.9 || 10.3 || 20.1 || 6.5 || 2.8 || 10
|-
| 2017 ||  || 6
| 12 || 0 || 0 || 90 || 96 || 186 || 53 || 14 || 0.0 || 0.0 || 7.5 || 8.0 || 15.5 || 6.5 || 1.2 || 0
|- class="sortbottom"
! colspan=3| Career
! 225 !! 5 !! 8 !! 2017 !! 1898 !! 3915 !! 1152 !! 469 !! 0.0 !! 0.0 !! 9.0 !! 8.4 !! 17.4 !! 5.1 !! 2.1 !! 27
|}

Honours and achievements
Team
 3× AFL premiership player: 2013, 2014, 2015
 2× Minor premiership: 2012, 2013

Individual
 All-Australian team: 2015
 2× Peter Crimmins Medal: 2013, 2015
  most consistent player: 2011
  best player in finals: 2011
  life member

Post-Football Career
In January 2018, Gibson was a celebrity contestant on the fourth season of the Australian version of I'm a Celebrity...Get Me Out of Here. On 5 March 2018, Gibson was evicted after 38 days in camp, coming in eighth place.

In 2018, he was a panelist on Sports Tonight.

In October 2020, Gibson was announced as a celebrity contestant on the new season of The Celebrity Apprentice Australia in 2021.

References

External links

1984 births
Living people
Hawthorn Football Club players
Hawthorn Football Club Premiership players
North Melbourne Football Club players
Australian rules footballers from Melbourne
Australian people of Barbadian descent
Port Melbourne Football Club players
Peter Crimmins Medal winners
All-Australians (AFL)
People educated at Trinity Grammar School, Kew
I'm a Celebrity...Get Me Out of Here! (Australian TV series) participants
The Apprentice Australia candidates
Three-time VFL/AFL Premiership players
People from Blackburn, Victoria